Events in the year 1934 in Norway.

Incumbents
 Monarch – Haakon VII
 Prime Minister – Johan Ludwig Mowinckel (Liberal Party)

Events

 7 April – A major rockfall hit Tafjorden in Møre og Romsdal, creating a  flood wave that destroyed the villages of Tafjord and Fjørå, killing 40 people.
 Municipal and county elections are held throughout the country.

Popular culture

Sports

Music

Film

Literature

Notable births
7 January – Per Ø. Grimstad, businessperson, diplomat and politician
11 January – Egil Johansen, jazz drummer, teacher, composer and arranger (died 1998)
15 February – Tinius Nagell-Erichsen, publisher (died 2007)
18 February – Arve Johnsen, industrial executive and politician
31 March – Knut Haug, politician
8 April – Gerd Søraa, writer and politician
8 April – Frans Widerberg, painter and graphic artist (d. 2017).
1 May – Mette Janson, journalist (died 2004).
18 June – Torbjørn Yggeseth, ski jumper
21 June – Bente Børsum, actress
29 June – Jarle Bondevik, philologist
12 July – Jan Grøndahl, police chief and civil servant
13 July – Trond Dolva, judge
14 August – Torhild Johnsen, politician
20 August – Hans E. Strand, politician
23 August – Leif Frode Onarheim, businessperson and politician
25 September – Alfred Oftedal Telhaug, educationalist.
29 September – Ragnhild Barland, politician
6 October  –  Odd S. Lovoll, Norwegian-American author, historian and educator
9 October – Harald Grønningen, cross country skier, double Olympic gold medallist and World Champion
14 October – Magnus Aarbakke, judge
20 October – Olav T. Laake, judge and politician
26 October – Ingvald Godal, politician
3 November – Roar Berthelsen, long jumper (died 1990)
5 November – Kjell Hallbing, author of Western books under the pseudonym Louis Masterson (died 2004)
6 December – Jacob Birger Natvig, physician, hospital director and medical researcher.
29 December – Geirmund Ihle, politician
29 December – Turid Iversen, politician

Full date unknown
Finn Haldorsen, businessperson

Notable deaths

21 January – Christian Lange Rolfsen, politician and Minister (born 1864)
19 February – Ivar Kleiven, local historian and poet (born 1854)
21 April – Carsten Borchgrevink, polar explorer (born 1864)
29 May – Nicolai Kiær, gymnast and Olympic silver medallist (born 1888)
29 May – Christian Bendz Kielland, civil servant (born 1858)
12 July – Ole Evinrude, inventor, known for the invention of the first outboard motor with practical commercial application, in America (born 1877)
30 July – Rasmus Olai Mortensen, politician and Minister (born 1869)
5 November – Hulda Garborg, writer, novelist, playwright, poet, folk dancer and theatre instructor (born 1862)
12 November – Jacob Marius Schøning, politician and Minister (born 1856)
16 November – Haakon Martin Evjenth, politician (born 1865)
12 December – Thorleif Haug, skier and Olympic gold medallist (born 1894)
19 December – Sven Elvestad, journalist and author (born 1884)

Full date unknown
Peter Collett Solberg, businessperson and politician (born 1866)

See also

References

External links